Waikaia, formerly known as Switzers, is a town in the Southland region of New Zealand's South Island. From 1909 until 1959, it was the terminus of the Waikaia Branch railway. The population in the 2013 census was 99, unchanged from the previous census in 2006.

The town is in the Southland District and is covered by the Waikaia Community Development Area Sub-committee. Facilities include a museum, to which is attached an iconic "bottle house", constructed from approximately 20,000 wine bottles.

The historic Glenaray Station farm is located close to Waikaia. Several of the farms buildings are Heritage New Zealand-classified structures.

Demographics
Waikaia is described as a rural settlement by Statistics New Zealand.

Waikaia had a population of 135 at the 2018 New Zealand census, an increase of 6 people (4.7%) since the 2013 census, and an increase of 21 people (18.4%) since the 2006 census. There were 60 households. There were 72 males and 63 females, giving a sex ratio of 1.14 males per female. The median age was 57.4 years (compared with 37.4 years nationally), with 21 people (15.6%) aged under 15 years, 15 (11.1%) aged 15 to 29, 48 (35.6%) aged 30 to 64, and 51 (37.8%) aged 65 or older.

Ethnicities were 97.8% European/Pākehā, 6.7% Māori, and 2.2% Asian (totals add to more than 100% since people could identify with multiple ethnicities).

Although some people objected to giving their religion, 42.2% had no religion, and 48.9% were Christian.

Of those at least 15 years old, 6 (5.3%) people had a bachelor or higher degree, and 45 (39.5%) people had no formal qualifications. The median income was $24,800, compared with $31,800 nationally. The employment status of those at least 15 was that 48 (42.1%) people were employed full-time, 21 (18.4%) were part-time, and 3 (2.6%) were unemployed.

Education
Waikaia School (originally called Switzers School) moved into the town from the hill above it about 1880, but burned down six weeks later, and was subsequently rebuilt.

Notable people
 

John Benjamin Charles Dore (1872–1945), carrier, tourist operator, secret government agent, explorer and surgeon

References

Further reading

Populated places in Southland, New Zealand